The 1987 Virginia Slims of Florida was a women's tennis tournament played on outdoor hard courts at The Polo Club in Boca Raton, Florida in the United States and was part of the Category 4 tier of the 1987 WTA Tour. It was the ninth edition of the tournament and was held from February 16 through February 22, 1987. Second-seeded Steffi Graf won the singles title and earned $50,000 first-prize money.

Finals

Singles
 Steffi Graf defeated  Helena Suková 6–2, 6–3
 It was Graf's 1st singles title of the year and the 9th of her career.

Doubles
 Svetlana Parkhomenko /  Larisa Savchenko defeated  Chris Evert-Lloyd /  Pam Shriver 6–0, 3–6, 6–2
 It was Parkhomenko's 3rd doubles title of the year and the 6th of her career. It was Savchenko's 3rd title of the year and the 6th of her career.

References

External links
 ITF tournament edition details
 tournament draws

Virginia Slims of Florida
Virginia Slims of Florida
Virginia Slims of Florida
Virginia Slims of Florida
Virginia Slims of Florida